The Japan Society for Cell Biology is a professional society for cell biology that was founded in 1950. It has published the journal Cell Structure and Function since 1975. It also organises an annual cell biology symposium.

References 

Organizations established in 1950
Biology societies